Jordy Thomassen (born 15 April 1993) is a Dutch professional footballer who plays as a striker for De Treffers. He formerly played for FC Den Bosch, RKC Waalwijk, De Graafschap, Adelaide United and Helmond Sport.

References

External links
 
 Voetbal International profile 
 

1993 births
Living people
Sportspeople from 's-Hertogenbosch
Footballers from North Brabant
Association football forwards
Association football wingers
Dutch footballers
FC Den Bosch players
RKC Waalwijk players
Helmond Sport players
De Graafschap players
Adelaide United FC players
Eredivisie players
Eerste Divisie players